"Keep Each Other Warm" is a 1986 single by Bucks Fizz. 

The song peaked at No. 45 in the UK Singles Chart in December 1986. It was the fifth and final single from their Writing on the Wall album, which was released at the same time. It also received positive reviews in the music press with Number One magazine stating; “Their best effort yet with the new line-up, but set beside the sheer genius of say “The Land of Make Believe”, it doesn't really cut the cake”, while Smash Hits predicted; “Bucks Fizz will find themselves back with a very welcome hit”. Like many other Bucks Fizz singles, "Keep Each Other Warm" was produced by Andy Hill and also co-written by him with Pete Sinfield.

The B-side was a song called "Give a Little Love", which went on to become a top 20 hit by Aswad two years later.

In 1989, "Keep Each Other Warm" was covered by Barry Manilow and released on his self-titled album. Manilow's version was released as a single, reaching No. 7 on the U.S. Billboard Adult contemporary chart.  Cash Box said of Manilow's version, produced by British producer Paul O'Duffy, that "the arrangement of this new toe-tapper is warm, loose and clean at the same time, one of the best things he’s ever done."

Track listing 
7"
 "Keep Each Other Warm" (4.12)
 "Give a Little Love" (3.30)

12"
  "Keep Each Other Warm (Long Version)" (5.37)
 "Give a Little Love (Long Version)" (4.40)

References 

1986 singles
Bucks Fizz songs
Songs with lyrics by Peter Sinfield
Songs written by Andy Hill (composer)